The  2022 Rising Phoenix World Championships was a professional bodybuilding competition for women that was held in conjunction with Arizona Women's Pro and the NPC Wings of Strength Arizona Women's Extravaganza. It was held on 5 November 2022 at the Gila River Resorts & Casinos – Wild Horse Pass in Chandler, Arizona, United States of America. It was the 8th Rising Phoenix World Championships to be held.

Results

Scorecard

Most muscular award
 Irene Andersen

Best poser award
 1st - Mona Poursaleh
 2nd - MayLa Ash
 3rd - Janeen Lankowski

Best intro video award
 1st - Janeen Lankowski 
 2nd - Sheena Ohlig
 3rd - MayLa Ash

Notable events
 This was Andrea Shaw's 3rd Ms. Rising Phoenix title win.

Awards
Most muscular award
 $5,000

Best poser award
 1st - $5,000
 2nd - $2,900
 3rd - $1,500
 Total - $9,400

Best video award
 1st - $5,000
 2nd - $2,500
 3rd - $1,500
 Total - $9,000

Ms. Rising Phoenix
 1st - $50,000 & American prize vehicle
 2nd - $25,000
 3rd - $12,500
 4th - $7,500
 5th - $5,000
 Total - $77,500 & Chevrolet Silverado 2500 HD

Total overall - $100,900 & Chevrolet Silverado 2500 HD

Official competitors list

 Andrea Shaw
 Mona Poursaleh
 Michaela Aycock
 Leah Dennie
 Irene Andersen
 Mayla Ash
 Reshanna Boswell
 Nadia Capotosto
 Lisa Cross
 Chelsa Dion
 Asha Hadley
 Michelle Jin
 Janeen Lankowski
 Sheena Ohlig
 Virginia Sanchez
 Tina Williams
 Aisling Hickey

External links 
 Official homepage

References

Rising Phoenix World Championships
Wings of Strength
History of female bodybuilding
Female professional bodybuilding competitions